Niall Joseph Thompson (born 16 April 1974) is a English-Canadian soccer player and coach, who works currently as an assistant coach with Vancouver FC of the Canadian Premier League.

Club career
Thompson moved to Canada, aged two, and later played for the Edmonton Brick Men and Winnipeg Fury in the Canadian Soccer League. He then played for the PSV Eindhoven youth team. He started his professional career as a trainee with Crystal Palace but after an unsuccessful spell moved to play for Colchester United, before returning to Canada for family reasons. Thompson played on for Montreal Impact, Seattle Sounders and Zultse VV, before returning to Canada again to play local football, while waiting for a visa which would allow him to play in the United States. Seattle Sounders expressed interest in re-signing him, but could not due to visa issues. A friend contacted Micky Adams, then-manager of English Second Division side Brentford and Thompson signed for the club on non-contract terms in February 1998. After leaving the Bees in September 1998, Thompson went on to play for Vancouver 86ers, Airdrieonians, Bay Area Seals, Wycombe Wanderers, Montreal Impact and Vancouver Whitecaps.

International career
Thompson represented Canada at the 1991 Pan American Games.
He made his senior debut for Canada in a March 1993 friendly match against South Korea and earned a total of nine caps, scoring two goals. He represented Canada in just one FIFA World Cup qualification match, in October 2000. That game, against Panama, proved to be his final international.

Coaching career
Thompson served as a coach with amateur club Surrey United SC, before joining Canadian Premier League club Vancouver FC as an assistant ahead of the 2023 season.

International goals
Scores and results list Canada's goal tally first.

Personal life 
While living in Vancouver in late 1997, Thompson worked for Umbro in a bid to earn money for a flight ticket back to the UK.

References

External links

1974 births
Living people
Footballers from Birmingham, West Midlands
English emigrants to Canada
Naturalized citizens of Canada
Association football forwards
English footballers
Canadian soccer players
Canada men's youth international soccer players
Canada men's international soccer players
Canadian expatriate sportspeople in the United States
English expatriate footballers
British expatriates in the Netherlands
British expatriates in Belgium
Crystal Palace F.C. players
Colchester United F.C. players
Montreal Impact (1992–2011) players
S.V. Zulte Waregem players
Seattle Sounders (1994–2008) players
Brentford F.C. players
Vancouver Whitecaps (1986–2010) players
Airdrieonians F.C. (1878) players
Bay Area Seals players
Wycombe Wanderers F.C. players
Vancouver Firefighters (soccer) players
USL First Division players
USISL players
Expatriate footballers in Belgium
Expatriate footballers in Scotland
Expatriate soccer players in the United States
Vancouver Whitecaps FC non-playing staff
Pan American Games competitors for Canada
Footballers at the 1991 Pan American Games
1993 CONCACAF Gold Cup players
1996 CONCACAF Gold Cup players
Canadian expatriate soccer players
Canadian expatriate sportspeople in Scotland
Canadian expatriate sportspeople in England
English expatriate sportspeople in the United States
Edmonton Brick Men players
Winnipeg Fury players
Vancouver FC non-playing staff